A highway is any public or private road or other public way on land. It is used for major roads, but also includes other public roads and public tracks. In some areas of the United States, it is used as an equivalent term to controlled-access highway, or a translation for autobahn, autoroute, etc.

According to Merriam Webster, the use of the term predates the 12th century. According to Etymonline, "high" is in the sense of "main".

In North American and Australian English, major roads such as controlled-access highways or arterial roads are often state highways (Canada: provincial highways). Other roads may be designated "county highways" in the US and Ontario. These classifications refer to the level of government (state, provincial, county) that maintains the roadway. In British English, "highway" is primarily a legal term. Everyday use normally implies roads, while the legal use covers any route or path with a public right of access, including footpaths etc.

The term has led to several related derived terms, including highway system, highway code, highway patrol and highwayman.

Overview 
Major highways are often named and numbered by the governments that typically develop and maintain them. China has the world's largest network of highways followed closely by the United States of America. Some highways, like the Pan-American Highway or the European routes, span multiple countries. Some major highway routes include ferry services, such as US Route 10, which crosses Lake Michigan.

Traditionally highways were used by people on foot or on horses. Later they also accommodated carriages, bicycles and eventually motor cars, facilitated by advancements in road construction. In the 1920s and 1930s, many nations began investing heavily in progressively more modern highway systems to spur commerce and bolster national defence.

Major modern highways that connect cities in populous developed and developing countries usually incorporate features intended to enhance the road's capacity, efficiency, and safety to various degrees. Such features include a reduction in the number of locations for user access, the use of dual carriageways with two or more lanes on each carriageway, and grade-separated junctions with other roads and modes of transport. These features are typically present on highways built as motorways (freeways).

Terminology

England and Wales 
The general legal definition deals with right of use not the form of construction; this is distinct from e.g. the popular use of the word in the US. A highway is defined in English common law by a number of similarly-worded definitions such as "a way over which all members of the public have the right to pass and repass without hindrance" usually accompanied by "at all times"; ownership of the ground is for most purposes irrelevant, thus the term encompasses all such ways from the widest trunk roads in public ownership to the narrowest footpath providing unlimited pedestrian access over private land.

A highway might be open to all forms of lawful land traffic (e.g. vehicular, horse, pedestrian) or limited to specific types of traffic or combinations of types of traffic; usually a highway available to vehicles is available to foot or horse traffic, a highway available to horse traffic is available to pedestrians but exceptions can apply usually in the form of a highway only being available to vehicles or subdivided into dedicated parallel sections for different users.

A highway can share ground with a private right of way for which full use is not available to the general public as often will be the case with farm roads which the owner may use for any purpose but for which the general public only has a right of use on foot or horseback. The status of highway on most older roads has been gained by established public use while newer roads are typically dedicated as highways from the time they are adopted (taken into the care and control of a council or other public authority). In England and Wales, a public highway is also known as "The Queen's Highway".

The core definition of a highway is modified in various legislation for a number of purposes but only for the specific matters dealt with in each such piece of legislation. This is typically in the case of bridges, tunnels and other structures whose ownership, mode of use or availability would otherwise exclude them from the general definition of a highway, examples in recent years are commonly toll bridges and tunnels which have the definition of highway imposed upon them (in a legal order applying only to the individual structure) to allow application of most traffic laws to those using them but without causing all of the general obligations or rights of use otherwise applicable to a highway.

What is called 'highway' in the context of motor vehicles is called 'motorway' in the UK context.

Scotland 
Scots law is similar to English law with regard to highways but with differing terminology and legislation. What is defined in England as a highway will often in Scotland be what is defined by s.151 Roads (Scotland) Act 1984 (but only "in this act" although other legislation could imitate) simply as a road, that is :-
"any way (other than a waterway) over which there is a public right of passage (by whatever means [and whether subject to a toll or not]) and includes the road’s verge, and any bridge (whether permanent or temporary) over which, or tunnel through which, the road passes; and any reference to a road includes a part thereof; "

The word highway is itself no longer a statutory expression in Scots law but remains in common law.

United States 

In American law, the word "highway" is sometimes used to denote any public way used for travel, whether a "road, street, and parkway"; however, in practical and useful meaning, a "highway" is a major and significant, well-constructed road that is capable of carrying reasonably heavy to extremely heavy traffic. Highways generally have a route number designated by the state and federal departments of transportation.

California Vehicle Code, Sections 360, 590, define a "highway" as only a way open for use of motor vehicles, but the California Supreme Court has held that "the definition of 'highway' in the Vehicle Code is used for special purposes of that act," and that canals of the Los Angeles neighborhood of Venice, California, are "highways" that are entitled to be maintained with state highway funds.

History 
Modern highway systems developed in the 20th century as the automobile gained popularity. The first United States limited access road was constructed on Long Island New York known as the Long Island Motor Parkway or the Vanderbilt Motor Parkway.  It was completed in 1911.

In Italy the Milano-Varese  autostrada was opened in 1924.

Construction of the Bonn–Cologne autobahn began in 1929 and it was opened in 1932 by the mayor of Cologne, Konrad Adenauer.

In the US, the Federal Aid Highway Act of 1921 (Phipps Act) enacted a fund to create an extensive highway system. In 1922, the first blueprint for a national highway system (the Pershing Map) was published. The Federal Aid Highway Act of 1956 allocated $25 billion for the construction of the  Interstate Highway System over a 20-year period.

In Great Britain, the Special Roads Act 1949 provided the legislative basis for roads for restricted classes of vehicles and non-standard or no speed limits applied (later mostly termed motorways but now with speed limits not exceeding 70 mph); in terms of general road law this legislation overturned the usual principle that a road available to vehicular traffic was also available to horse or pedestrian traffic as is usually the only practical change when non-motorways are reclassified as special roads. The first section of motorway in the UK opened in 1958 (part of the M6 motorway) and then in 1959 the first section of the M1 motorway.

Social effects 

Reducing travel times relative to city or town streets, modern highways with limited access and grade separation create increased opportunities for people to travel for business, trade or pleasure and also provide trade routes for goods. Modern highways reduce commute and other travel time but additional road capacity can also release latent traffic demand. If not accurately predicted at the planning stage, this extra traffic may lead to the new road becoming congested sooner than would otherwise be anticipated by considering increases in vehicle ownership. More roads allow drivers to use their cars when otherwise alternatives may have been sought, or the journey may not have been made, which can mean that a new road brings only short-term mitigation of traffic congestion.

Where highways are created through existing communities, there can be reduced community cohesion and more difficult local access. Consequently, property values have decreased in many cutoff neighborhoods, leading to decreased housing quality over time.

Economic effects 

In transport, demand can be measured in numbers of journeys made or in total distance travelled across all journeys (e.g. passenger-kilometres for public transport or vehicle-kilometres of travel (VKT) for private transport). Supply is considered to be a measure of capacity. The price of the good (travel) is measured using the generalised cost of travel, which includes both money and time expenditure.

The effect of increases in supply (capacity) are of particular interest in transport economics (see induced demand), as the potential environmental consequences are significant (see externalities below).

In addition to providing benefits to their users, transport networks impose both positive and negative externalities on non-users. The consideration of these externalities—particularly the negative ones—is a part of transport economics. Positive externalities of transport networks may include the ability to provide emergency services, increases in land value and agglomeration benefits. Negative externalities are wide-ranging and may include local air pollution, noise pollution, light pollution, safety hazards, community severance and congestion. The contribution of transport systems to potentially hazardous climate change is a significant negative externality which is difficult to evaluate quantitatively, making it difficult (but not impossible) to include in transport economics-based research and analysis. Congestion is considered a negative externality by economists.

A 2016 study finds that for the United States "a 10% increase in a region's stock of highways causes a 1.7% increase in regional patenting over a five-year period." A 2021 study found that areas that obtained access to a new highway experienced a substantial increase in top-income taxpayers and a decline in low-income taxpayers. Highways also contributed to job and residential urban sprawl.

Environmental effects 

Highways are extended linear sources of pollution.

Roadway noise increases with operating speed so major highways generate more noise than arterial streets. Therefore, considerable noise health effects are expected from highway systems. Noise mitigation strategies exist to reduce sound levels at nearby sensitive receptors. The idea that highway design could be influenced by acoustical engineering considerations first arose about 1973.

Air quality issues: Highways may contribute fewer emissions than arterials carrying the same vehicle volumes. This is because high, constant-speed operation creates an emissions reduction compared to vehicular flows with stops and starts. However, concentrations of air pollutants near highways may be higher due to increased traffic volumes. Therefore, the risk of exposure to elevated levels of air pollutants from a highway may be considerable, and further magnified when highways have traffic congestion.

New highways can also cause habitat fragmentation, encourage urban sprawl and allow human intrusion into previously untouched areas, as well as (counterintuitively) increasing congestion, by increasing the number of intersections.

They can also reduce the use of public transport, indirectly leading to greater pollution.

High-occupancy vehicle lanes are being added to some newer/reconstructed highways in the United States and other countries around the world to encourage carpooling and mass-transit. These lanes help reduce the number of cars on the highway and thus reduces pollution and traffic congestion by promoting the use of carpooling in order to be able to use these lanes. However, they tend to require dedicated lanes on a highway, which makes them difficult to construct in dense urban areas where they are the most effective.

To address habitat fragmentation, wildlife crossings have become increasingly popular in many countries. Wildlife crossings allow animals to safely cross human-made barriers like highways.

Road traffic safety 

Road traffic safety describes the safety performance of roads and streets, and methods used to reduce the harm (deaths, injuries, and property damage) on the highway system from traffic collisions. It includes the design, construction and regulation of the roads, the vehicles used on them and the training of drivers and other road-users.

A report published by the World Health Organization in 2004 estimated that some 1.2 million people were killed and 50 million injured on the roads around the world each year and was the leading cause of death among children 10–19 years of age.

The report also noted that the problem was most severe in developing countries and that simple prevention measures could halve the number of deaths. For reasons of clear data collection, only harm involving a road vehicle is included. A person tripping with fatal consequences or dying for some unrelated reason on a public road is not included in the relevant statistics.

Statistics 

The United States has the world's largest network of highways, including both the Interstate Highway System and the United States Numbered Highway System. At least one of these networks is present in every state and they interconnect most major cities.

In 2008 alone,  expressways were added to the network.

The Pan-American Highway is discontinuous because there is a significant gap in it in southeastern Panama, where the rainfall is immense and the terrain is entirely unsuitable for highway construction.
Longest national highway (point to point) The Trans-Canada Highway has one main route, a northern route through the western provinces, and several branches in the central and eastern provinces. The TCH runs east-west across southern Canada, the populated portion of the country, and it connects many of the major urban centres along its route crossing all provinces, and reaching nearly all of their capital cities. The TCH begins on the east coast in Newfoundland, traverses that island, and crosses to the mainland by ferry. It crosses the Maritime Provinces of eastern Canada with a branch route serving the province of Prince Edward Island via a ferry and bridge. After crossing the remainder of the country's mainland, the highway reaches Vancouver, British Columbia on the Pacific coast, where a ferry continues it to Vancouver Island and the provincial capital of Victoria. Numeric designation is the responsibility of the provinces, and there is no single route number across the country. 
It runs almost the entire way around the country's coastline. With the exception of the Federal Capital of Canberra, which is far inland, Highway 1 links all of Australia's capital cities, although Brisbane and Darwin are not directly connected, but rather are bypassed short distances away. Also, there is a ferry connection to the island state of Tasmania, and then a stretch of Highway 1 that links the major towns and cities of Tasmania, including Launceston and Hobart (this state's capital city).
Busiest highway Highway 401 in Ontario, Canada, has volumes surpassing an average of 500,000 vehicles per day in some sections of Toronto .
Widest highway (maximum number of lanes) The Katy Freeway (part of Interstate 10) in Houston, Texas, has a total of 26 lanes in some sections . However, they are divided up into general use/ frontage roads/ HOV lanes, restricting the traverse traffic flow.
Widest highway (maximum number of through lanes) Interstate 5 along a  section between Interstate 805 and California State Route 56 in San Diego, California, which was completed in April 2007, is 22 lanes wide.
Highest national highway National Highway 5, in India, connecting Amritsar in Punjab with Manali in Himachal Pradesh & Leh in Ladakh, reaches an approximate altitude of .. The highest motorable road passes through Umling La at an altitude of  falls under the branch highway connecting National Highway 5 in India.

Bus lane 

Some countries incorporate bus lanes onto highways.

South Korea 
In South Korea, in February 1995 a bus lane (essentially an HOV-9) was established between the northern terminus and Sintanjin for important holidays and on 1 July 2008 bus lane enforcement between Seoul and Osan (Sintanjin on weekends) became daily between 6 a.m. and 10 p.m. On 1 October this was adjusted to 7 a.m. to 9 p.m. weekdays, and 9 a.m. to 9 p.m. weekends.

Hong Kong 
In Hong Kong, some highways are set up with bus lanes to solve the traffic congestion.

Philippines 
Traffic congestion was a principal problem in major roads and highways in the Philippines, especially in Metro Manila and other major cities. The government decided to set up some bus lanes in Metro Manila like in the Epifanio delos Santos Avenue.

Gallery

See also

General 

 Bypass route
 Controlled-access highway
 Divided highway (dual carriageway)

 Freeway
 Highway systems by country
 Highwayman
 Infrastructure
 Limited-access road
 List of roads and highways
 Motorway
 Parkway
 Passing lane
 Ring road
 Road
 Road junction
 Road safety
 Road transport
 Roadway air dispersion modeling
 Roadway noise
 Toll road
 Undivided highway (single carriageway)

By country 

 Algeria East–West Highway
 Autobahns of Austria
 Autoput and Autocesta 
 Rodovia 
 Avtomagistrala 
 Highways in Canada
 Expressway 
 Autocesta 
 Dálnice 
 Autostrada 
 Autoroute 
 Autobahns of Germany
 Aftokinitodromos 
 Autópálya 
 National Highways and Expressways 
 Motorway 
 List of highways in Israel
 Autostrade of Italy 
 Kōsokudōro 
 Lebuhraya 
 Autopista de Carretera Federal 
 Autoroute 
 Avtopat 
 Motorvei 
 Motorways and National Highways of Pakistan
 Autoestrada  
 Russian federal highways 
 Autoput 
 Avtocesta 
 Autopista 
 Motorväg 
 Autobahns of Switzerland
 Freeways in Taiwan
 Thai highway network 
 State Highways (Ukraine) 
 Highways in the United Kingdom
 Autofamba

References

External links 

 Full list of Euroroutes with distances
 The Greenroads Rating System
 Legal opinion, Kansas, U.S.A.
 Proposed Trans-Global Highway
 Euroroutes with distances
 Ontario Super Highway Program (June 19, 2011)
 Video of Highway 401 through Greater Toronto

 
Road infrastructure
Types of roads